Sharon Beasley-Teague (born February 15, 1952) is an American politician from Georgia. She is a member of the Democratic Party and a member of the Georgia House of Representatives representing the state's 65th district. In 2020, she was defeated in the runoff election by Mandisha Thomas.

Education
Beasley-Teague graduated from Indiana College of Business Technology and attended Georgia State University.

Committee assignments
Beasley-Teague currently serves on the following committees:
Game, Fish, and Parks
Human Relations and Aging
Legislative and Congressional Reapportionment
Ways and Means

Elections

References

1952 births
Living people
20th-century American politicians
21st-century American politicians
20th-century American women politicians
21st-century American women politicians
Democratic Party members of the Georgia House of Representatives
Georgia State University alumni
Women state legislators in Georgia (U.S. state)
Place of birth missing (living people)